Grizzly 399 (born 1996) is a grizzly bear inhabiting Grand Teton National Park and Bridger-Teton National Forest. She is followed by as many as 40 wildlife photographers, and millions of tourists come to the Greater Yellowstone Ecosystem to see her and the other grizzly bears. Grizzly 399 is the most famous brown bear mother in the world, with her own Facebook and Twitter accounts.

Background
North American brown bears, popularly known as grizzly bears, are a subspecies Ursos arctos horribilis of the Brown Bear species U. arctos. Several decades ago, grizzlies were assessed as being at risk of rapid extinction due to the rate at which the population was declining. The Endangered Species Act of 1973 has resulted in a population rebound: there are now approximately 2,000 bears in the United States, of which about half are estimated to live in the Greater Yellowstone Ecosystem. Grizzlies are stereotyped as ferocious, but the typical bear avoids contact with humans, living away from settlements and attacking only to protect themselves when startled by a human.

When bears become too habituated to human presence and become aggressive in their pursuit of human food, or when a bear attacks a human, the "problem bear" is typically euthanized. Grizzly mothers are known for being aggressively protective of their progeny. In 2011, in Yellowstone National Park, a mother bear fatally mauled a hiker who got too close. Grizzly 610, 399's daughter, twice lunged at tourists who approached too closely. No injuries were reported.

Grand Teton Wildlife Brigade
The Grand Teton Wildlife Brigade was created in 2007 when Grizzly 399 appeared with her 3 one-year-old cubs alongside the road and became an international celebrity, attracting travelers from all over. Their mandate is to keep the people and animals apart and keep both from harm. Grand Teton ranger Kate Wilmot relates that the situation the citizen "brigaders" face has "gone from a somewhat chaotic atmosphere the last couple of years to a completely chaotic one now," as social media has increased the popularity of the bears, and drawn more people to want to interact with them. "My official title is 'bear management specialist,' but the real challenge is managing the behavior of people."

Wilmot is in charge of 16 volunteers in the brigade who work in the summer until snowfall. "If the brigaders weren't there and wildlife watching were allowed to turn into a free-for-all, we'd have injured humans and bears, dangerous situations with motorists, and people throwing food out their car windows," says Wilmot. "It would be a mess." The brigaders carry bear spray, but their primary role is to persuade tourists to maintain the 100-yard viewing guideline established after the incidents with Grizzly 610.

Another issue they have to deal with is stopping people from feeding the bears. Feeding bears can cause them to become aggressive or result in having to euthanize a bear who will not stay out of the garbage. The brigade tries to remind tourists of the role they play in the bear's fate. The brigade's success can be measured in the rarity of major incidents and bear removals.

Life
Grizzly 399 is a grizzly bear who resides on Federal land in a range of hundreds of miles throughout the Grand Teton National Park and the Bridger-Teton National Forest. She was born in a den in Pilgrim Creek, Wyoming, in the winter of 1996, and given her name as a research number by the Yellowstone Interagency Grizzly Bear Study Team.

At age 26, she is older than is usual for a grizzly, as "more than 85 percent of them are killed because of some kind of human activity before they reach old age". She weighs almost . Unlike the typical grizzly, she lives in close proximity to humans, although she is not particularly concerned with them; scientists have speculated that this was in response to a death of a cub in a more remote area, perhaps killed by a male grizzly. She has not killed a human despite at least two known close encounters, and so has also avoided euthanasia.

Cubs
She has reared many successful progeny, including 22 cubs and grandcubs. In mid-May 2020 she was observed with four new cubs born the previous winter. She has taught her offspring habits to benefit from rather than be harmed by human proximity, such as loitering during the fall elk hunt to consume abandoned elk guts, and looking both ways before crossing roadways to avoid being struck by vehicles, a common cause of death among bears.

Despite this, at least three of her cubs have been killed due to human encounters, including Grizzly 399's only 2016 cub, nicknamed 'Snowy' because of his whitish-blonde face coloration.  In June of that year, Snowy was struck and killed by a car in Grand Teton National Park, an incident investigated as a potential hit-and-run accident. In all, she has lost half of her descendants, due to encounters with people or male bears.

Steve Franklin, a resident of Glendale, Arizona, and a wildlife photographer, was there on Monday, May 21, 2020. According to Franklin, his bucket list included being in Grand Teton National Park on opening day and observing Grizzly 399 come out of hibernation. Earlier, a ranger informed him that the 24 year old mother bear was still unsighted this year. Later, approximately 2:30 p.m., Franklin was driving for lunch when he observed movement on the bank of the Pilgrim Creek. It turned out to be Grizzly 399, and she had four cubs with her. This was her largest brood to date.

Triplets
Unlike the typical bear, Grizzly 399 regularly gives birth to triplets rather than twins. This typically has a paradoxical effect on the bear population. A mother bear with three cubs expends significantly more energy in caring for them, which can potentially decrease rather than increase the survival rate. Grizzly 399, conversely, has typically handled triplets well. One of her triplets grew to also be a prolific mother (thus far the only one of her cubs to also produce cubs) and was tagged for research as Grizzly 610.  In 2011, Grizzly 610 had twins while Grizzly 399 had another set of triplets. The scientists observing the bears were concerned due to 399's advanced age, but to their surprise Grizzly 610 amicably adopted one of her mother's triplets.

Relationship with humans
Grizzly 399 is known for having become habituated to people when near roads and mildly developed areas. A researcher determined that she seeks these roadside areas over backcountry because it is safer for her cubs, where male bears often try to kill them. The fact that she spends much time near roads has also contributed to her popularity. In 2011, the sight of a mother grizzly bear and her three cubs near a road in central Grand Teton National Park was enough to cause traffic to come to a halt in both directions for miles. Near Jackson Lake Lodge, just below it, in Willow Flats, Grizzly 399 taught each set of cubs to hunt elk calves. She did this where the guests of the lodge could see unhindered.

Wildlife photographer Roger Hayden started following Grizzly 399 from the beginning. He says she is usually found along the roadside near the Oxbow Bend of the Snake River. The number of photographers now following this grizzly has grown to maybe 40 or 50 as of 2015. "399 is considered the grand matriarch of the park’s roadside bears."

In 2016, Grizzly 399 was feared dead after a hunter claimed to have killed her. Photographer Bernie Scates staked out a spot in Pilgrim Creek and waited for her to appear. She was running late in coming out of hibernation. On May 10, 2016, Scates became the first to see 399 emerge from hibernation, with one cub in tow. She came forth from the Bridger-Teton National Forest into the Grand Teton National Park with a white-faced cub following at her side. This news was quickly shared and celebrated online. In 2017, Grizzly 399 was older than the age beyond which most brown bears usually breed. But on May 16, 2017, she had two cubs following her in a spring snowstorm.

Endangered species protection and hunting
In 2017, the United States Fish and Wildlife Services officials removed grizzly bears from the endangered species list and turned management of grizzlies outside Yellowstone and Grand Teton National Parks over to Wyoming, Montana, and Idaho. Grizzlies live in ranges covering hundreds of miles, which can take them outside the parks, where they would be open to hunting. Grizzly 399 dens outside of the parks.

Hunters in the area would target 399 because she is the biggest and most famous trophy. Daryl Hunter, a wildlife photographer who follows Grizzly 399, related a conversation with an outfitter who said, "I met a guy who wants Grizzly 399's rug on his wall, stating that because she is famous, she makes a better trophy". Grizzly 399 spends part of the year in Grand Teton National Park, but also hibernates in the national forest where hunting is allowed.

For the 2018 hunting season, Montana decided against a hunt. Idaho, with the fewest grizzlies, decided to allow hunting of only one bear. On May 23, 2018, the Wyoming wildlife commission voted unanimously to approve a grizzly bear hunt. The Wyoming Game and Fish Department let a vote decide the number of grizzlies to be killed. The tally came to 22 grizzlies in a unanimous vote of 7-0. The hunting season was planned for September 15 to November 15. This was to be the first authorized hunt in Wyoming in 44 years since they were first listed as endangered in 1975, at which time no hunting was allowed inside the national parks or the connecting road between them, and the grizzly population had fallen to around 136 individuals.

Wyoming's planned hunt met with public outcry. Five women in Jackson Hole quickly organized "Shoot'em With A Camera-Not A Gun," which encouraged opponents of trophy hunting to join the tag lottery in hopes of preventing hunters from winning tags. Approximately 7,000 people applied for Wyoming bear tags, including Mangelsen, Jane Goodall, and other conservationists.

In July 2018, Mangelsen learned he was positioned high enough on a hunting lottery to actually receive a hunting tag, slot number 8 in the queue. In September, just weeks before hunting season was to begin, a federal judge in Montana restored protection to all of the bears in the Greater Yellowstone Ecosystem. The judge ruled that the United States Fish and Wildlife Service officials were "arbitrary and capricious" when they removed protection from the bears under the Endangered Species Act. In July 2020, the Ninth Circuit Court of Appeals upheld the Montana judge's ruling.

In March 2021, the U.S. Fish and Wildlife Service recommended no change to the current listed status of the grizzly bear in the lower-48 states. They will continue to remain threatened under the ESA after the completion of a five-year status review.

In popular culture

Books 
Grizzly 399:  The Story of a Remarkable Bear is a children's book published in May 2020 by an award-winning publisher of Idaho Falls. The book is written by Sylvia M. Medina, illustrated by Morgan Spicer and includes photographs by American nature and wildlife photographer, Thomas D. Mangelsen. The publisher published a subsequent book with the same author, illustrator and photographer in April 2021 to include Grizzly 399's new cubs, titled, "Grizzly 399's Hibernation Pandemonium" after the 24-year-old mother bear surprised the world with the birth of four more cubs in the Spring of 2020.

Grizzlies of Pilgrim Greek In 2015, Thomas D. Mangelsen collaborated with Wilkinson to create the book about Grizzly 399 and her progeny. Mangelsen made it one of his priorities for over ten years to record her life, including her hibernation schedule, feeding, and mothering; he recorded the birth of three sets of triplets and a set of twins. His photographs, especially the one he dubbed, "An Icon of Motherhood", helped make her the most famous mother grizzly, maybe the most famous grizzly, in the world. Millions of people visit the Greater Yellowstone Ecosystem just to see these grizzly bears.

Facebook account
By 2015, Grizzly 399 was known to have acquired a full social media presence, although it is a mystery who is running the accounts. She has her own Facebook page, Instagram account, and a Twitter handle. "These aren't just any bears", explains Thomas D. Mangelsen, a global wildlife photographer who lives in Jackson Hole, Wyoming, "They might be the most famous grizzlies alive today on the planet. For all these people, catching a glimpse of them is the thrill of a lifetime." Mangelsen has been following her movements for over ten years. Grizzly 399 dispels the stereotype that all grizzlies are agents of terror, says Bozeman, Montana, author Todd Wilkinson. "She’s more well-behaved a lot of times than people around her," he said. "But she’s wild", he adds.

See also
 List of individual bears

References

External links 
 Grand Teton Parks Grizzly Bears 399 & 610 - YouTube
 Always Endangered - The Story of Grizzly 399 - YouTube
 Grizzlies of Pilgrim Creek (Book Trailer) - YouTube
 VIDEO: Grizzly 399 and cubs | Multimedia | jhnewsandguide.com

 
Carnivorans of North America
Mammals of the United States
Scavengers
Least concern biota of North America
Least concern biota of the United States
Symbols of Montana
ESA threatened species
Individual bears
1996 animal births